Scott Kenemore (born 1977) is an American novelist and satirist. He graduated from Kenyon College in 2000, and has an MFA from Columbia University. A member of the Zombie Research Society and the Horror Writers Association, Scott lives in Evanston, Illinois.

Bibliography

Novels
Zombie, Ohio (2011)
Zombie, Illinois (2012)
The Grand Hotel (2014)
Zombie, Indiana (2014)
Zombie-in-Chief (2017)
Lake of Darkness (2020)

Satirical works
The Zen of Zombie: Better Living Through the Undead (2007)
Z.E.O, (2009)
The Art of Zombie Warfare (2010)
The Code of the Zombie Pirate (2010)
Zombies vs. Nazis (2011)
The Ultimate Book of Zombie Warfare and Survival (2015)

Other Appearances
Scott Kenemore appears as a special guest on the CD "The Adventures Of Finglonger" by hip-hop artist African-American Zombie Lawyer.  Before the appearance, Scott praised AAZL in his online blog, calling him "the best rapper in the Midwest...hands down."

References

External links
 
 The short story "Killer at the Kenyon Review Online

21st-century American novelists
American male novelists
American satirists
Living people
1977 births
21st-century American male writers
20th-century American drummers
American male drummers
21st-century American non-fiction writers
American male non-fiction writers
21st-century American drummers
20th-century American male musicians
21st-century American male musicians